Josephine Mary Wedderburn Pullein-Thompson MBE (3 April 1924 – 19 June 2014), sometimes known as Josephine Mann, was a British writer known for her pony books. She was a leading member of the Pony Club and PEN International. Her mother and two sisters, Christine and Diana also wrote and they created a large number of books and many of them were on the theme of horses.

Life
Pullein-Thompson was born on 3 April 1924 into a notable family. Her father, Harold Pullein-Thompson, had the Military Cross and her mother, Joanna Cannan, was a prolific and successful author. She was the second child as she had an elder brother who would adopt his mother's name to be a successful playwright of comedies as Denis Cannan. She also had two younger sisters (who were twins) and all the children would be writers.

The family home was a villa in the suburb of Wimbledon where her father would have two seats on the centre court. Her father was badly wounded and in frequent pain, he had earned the Military Cross during the war. He had been a teacher before the war but he sold fridges and had a game company. His game company was the first to manufacture the game "Go" under its Chinese name, but it has her mother who made more money writing pony books. The family moved to Rotherfield Peppard in Oxfordshire where their large house, The Grove, had its own stables. The girls learned to ride and would compete in events. In time they would describe their country childhood in their joint autobiography Fair Girls and Grey Horses (2014). The girls had an unusual education as distinct from their brother who went to Eton College. She was taught by a "mad woman in a hut" and she was rebellious and stubborn. The girls prided themselves on not conforming to expectations.

When she was fifteen and her sisters were fourteen they abandoned education and they started a riding school in wartime Britain. The riding school brought in extra money as the three sisters taught others to ride.

In 1946, she had her first book, Six Ponies, published and the die was cast as she had also helped write It Began With Picotee which the three sisters created together in 1941, but published also in 1946. The sisters would write dozens of books and Josephine wrote four dozen herself.

Josephine was vice president of the Woodland Hunt Branch of the British Pony Club.

She was given the MBE in 1984.

She was the general secretary (1976–93) and then president of PEN International.

She got the Golden PEN Award in 2007 for her services to literature.

Private life
For the last twenty years of her life, she was the devoted companion of the lawyer and author Anthony Babington. He had been so wounded during the war that his girlfriend abandoned him. He had to regain his voice as that part of his brain was damaged. Until he died in 2004 Babington would travel with Josephine to PEN meetings around the world.

Works
Six Ponies (1946)
I Had Two Ponies (1947)
Plenty of Ponies (1949)
Pony Club Team (1950)
The Radney Riding Club (1951)
Prince Among Ponies (1952)
One Day Event (1954)
Show Jumping Secret (1955)
Patrick's Pony (1956)
Pony Club Camp (1957)
The Trick Jumpers (1958)
All Change (1961; later republished as The Hidden Horse)
How Horses Are Trained (non-fiction, 1961)
Ponies In Colour (non-fiction) (1962)
Learn To Ride Well (non-fiction, 1966, later republished as How To Ride Well)
Horses and Their Owners (non-fiction, 1970)
Race Horse Holiday (1971, also published as Racehorse Holiday)
Proud Riders (1973)
Black Ebony (1975)
Star Riders Of The Moor (1974; later republished as Star Riders)
Ride Better And Better (with her sister, non-fiction, 1977)
Fear Treks The Moor (1978)
Black Nightshade (1978)
Ride To The Rescue (1979)
Ghost Horse On The Moor (1980)
The No-Good Pony (1981)
Treasure On The Moor (1982)
The Prize Pony (1982)
Black Raven (1982)
Pony Club Cup (1982)
Save The Ponies (1984)
Mystery On The Moor (1984)
Pony Club Challenge (1984)
Pony Club Trek (1985)
Suspicion Stalks The Moor (1986)
Black Swift (1991)
A Job With Horses (1994)

Dates Unknown

Youth In The Saddle (contributor)

She wrote the adult mystery books Gin and Murder (1959), Murder Strikes Pink (1963) and They Died In The Spring (1960).  She also wrote the book A Place With Two Faces (1972) under the pseudonym of Josephine Mann.

References

English children's writers
English women writers
Members of the Order of the British Empire
1924 births
2014 deaths
Presidents of the English Centre of PEN